Bolshiye Dvorishcha is a rural locality (a village) in Pertsevskoye Rural Settlement, Gryazovetsky District, Vologda Oblast, Russia. The population was 81 as of 2002.

Geography 
Bolshiye Dvorishcha is located 14 km southeast of Gryazovets (the district's administrative centre) by road. Rameshki is the nearest rural locality.

References 

Rural localities in Gryazovetsky District